Village Vanguard is a book store chain that is run by Village Vanguard Corporation in Nagoya, Aichi Prefecture, Japan. The concept of the store is "A playful book store" (ja:遊べる本屋). Although it is a book store, it carries a wide variety of products other than books, such as CDs, DVDs, and SPICEs, which makes it close to being a variety store.

History 
The first Village Vanguard store opened in the Tenpaku ward of Nagoya.　

The store was named after Village Vanguard, a jazz club located in New York City. This is because Kikuchi first planned on playing jazz in the bookstore, which actually never happened.

Stores 
Village Vanguard has 358 shops in total all across Japan, with each store having a completely different layout. The layout of products is one of the biggest characteristics of this store; instead of making the layout simply by category, they locate their product based on the employee's creativity.

Lists

Books 
Although Village Vanguard is distinct as a bookstore, their book sales only makes up for around 30% of their total sales. Unlike majority of the chain book stores, their line up of books varies a lot in every store, because the selection of books are basically up to the person in charge of each store.

Collaborations 
Village vanguard is known for collaborating with various things, such as bands, companies, YouTubers and more. The merchandise varies time to time, and they produce things such as clothing, key chains, towels to bowls, sandals etc.

SPICE 
SPICE is a term used in Village Vanguard which stands for Select, Pop, Intelligence, Culture and Entertainment. It is used to refer to all the products except books, CDs and DVDs, things such as toys, clothes and accessories.

References

Bookstores of Japan
Companies based in Nagoya
Retail companies established in 1986
Japanese companies established in 1986